Miguel Reisinho may refer to:
Miguel Reisinho (footballer, born 1975), Portuguese footballer
Miguel Reisinho (footballer, born 1999), Portuguese footballer